The 1986 USFL Territorial Draft was the fourth and last Territorial Draft of the United States Football League (USFL). It took place on April 23, 1986.

Player selections

References

External links
 1986 USFL Territorial Draft Pick Transactions
 Daily Sport News

United States Football League drafts
USFL Territorial Draft
USFL Territorial Draft
1980s in Manhattan
American football in New York City
Sports in Manhattan
Sporting events in New York City
USFL Territorial Draft